He Leadeth Me may refer to:
 "He Leadeth Me" (hymn), a hymn by Joseph Henry Gilmore
 He Leadeth Me (album), an album by Cissy Houston
 He Leadeth Me (Pat Boone album), an album by Pat Boone